Jake Beale (born October 17, 2001) is a Canadian actor. His roles include Mike the Knight (2011), Rob the Robot (2010), Daniel Tiger's Neighborhood (2012–2014), Arthur (2012–2014) and A Dennis the Menace Christmas (2007). He began acting at the age of four.

Filmography

References

External links

2001 births
Canadian male film actors
Canadian male television actors
Canadian male voice actors
Living people
Male actors from Toronto